A Guide to information sources (or a bibliographic guide, a literature guide, a guide to reference materials, a subject gateway, etc.) is a kind of metabibliography. Ideally it is not just a listing of bibliographies, reference works  and other source texts, but more like a textbook introducing users to the information sources in a given field (in general).

Such guides may have many different forms: Comprehensive or highly selective, printed or electronic sources, annotated listings or written chapters etc.

Functions
Often used as curriculum tools for bibliographic instruction, the guides help library users find materials or help those unfamiliar with a discipline understand the key sources.

Examples

Aby, Stephen H., Nalen, James & Fielding, Lori (2005). Sociology; a guide to reference and information sources. 3rd ed. Westport, Conn.: Libraries Unlimited.

Adams, Stephen R. (2005). Information Sources in Patents; 2nd ed. (Guides to Information Sources). München: K. G. Saur 

Blewett, Daniel K (2008). American military history; a guide to reference and information sources. 2nd ed. Westport, CT : Libraries Unlimited.

Jacoby, JoAnn & Kibbee, Josephine Z. (2007). Cultural anthropology; a guide to reference and information sources. 2nd ed. Westport, Conn.: Libraries Unlimited.

Schmidt, Diane & Bell, George H. (2003). Guide to reference and information sources in the zoological sciences. Westport, Conn. : Libraries Unlimited.

O'Hare, Christine  (2007). Business Information Sources. London: Library Assn Pub Ltd

Ostwald, W (1919). Die chemische Literatur und die Organisation der Wissenschaft. Leipzig : W. Ostwald & C. Drucker. (This is considered the first "guide to information sources").

Stebbins, Leslie F. (2006).  Student guide to research in the digital age; how to locate and evaluate information sources. Westport, Conn.: Libraries Unlimited.

Webb, W. H. et al. (Ed.). (1986). Sources of information in the social sciences. A Guide to the literature. 3. ed. Chicago : American Library Association.

Zell, Hans M. (ed.). (2003).  The African studies companion; a guide to information sources. 3rd rev. and expanded ed. Glais Bheinn : Hans Zell.

See also

Information literacy
Information source
Metabibliography
Pathfinder (Library Science)
Reference work

Literature

Bottle, R. T. (1997). Information science. I: Feather, J. & Sturges, P. (Eds.). International encyclopedia of library and information science. London & New York : Routledge. (pp. 212–214).
Vileno, L. (2007). From paper to electronic, the evolution of pathfinders: a review of the literature. Reference Services Review. 35(3), 434-451. Også tilgængelig 2009-08-16 fra: http://www.emeraldinsight.com/Insight/ViewContentServlet?contentType=Article&Filename=Published/EmeraldFullTextArticle/Articles/2400350310.html
Library Trends, 1990, vol 38, issues 3-4, p 453 Google Books
S Hargitay and S-M Yu. Property Investment Decisions: A Quantitative Approach. Routledge. Page 255

Information science
Library science
Bibliography
Reference works
Sources
Works about history